This is a list of law enforcement agencies in the state of Kansas.

According to the US Bureau of Justice Statistics' 2008 Census of State and Local Law Enforcement Agencies, the state had 371 law enforcement agencies employing 7,450 sworn police officers, about 266 for each 100,000 residents.

State Agencies 
 Kansas Bureau of Investigation
 Kansas Department of Corrections
 Kansas Department of Revenue
 Kansas State Alcoholic Beverage Control
 Kansas Department of Wildlife, Parks and Tourism
 Kansas Highway Patrol
 Kansas State Fire Marshal
  Kansas Lottery Security & Law Enforcement Division (S.L.E.D.)
  Kansas Department of Labor
  Kansas Attorney General's Office

County agencies 

 Allen County Sheriff's Office
 Anderson County Sheriff's Office
 Atchison County Sheriff's Office
 Barber County Sheriff's Office
 Barton County Sheriff's Office
 Bourbon County Sheriff's Office
 Brown County Sheriff's Office
 Butler County Sheriff's Office
 Chase County Sheriff's Office
 Chautauqua County Sheriff's Office
 Cherokee County Sheriff's Office
 Cheyenne County Sheriff's Office
 Clark County Sheriff's Office
 Clay County Sheriff's Office
 Cloud County Sheriff's Office
 Coffey County Sheriff's Office
 Comanche County Sheriff's Office
 Cowley County Sheriff's Office
 Crawford County Sheriff's Office
 Decatur County Sheriff's Office
 Dickinson County Sheriff's Office
 Doniphan County Sheriff's Office
 Douglas County Sheriff's Office
 Edwards County Sheriff's Office
 Elk County Sheriff's Office
 Ellis County Sheriff's Office
 Ellsworth County Sheriff's Office
 Finney County Sheriff's Office
 Ford County Sheriff's Office
 Franklin County Sheriff's Office
 Geary County Sheriff's Office
 Gove County Sheriff's Office
 Graham County Sheriff's Office
 Grant County Sheriff's Office
 Gray County Sheriff's Office

 Greeley County Sheriff's Office
 Greenwood County Sheriff's Office
 Hamilton County Sheriff's Office
 Harper County Sheriff's Office
 Harvey County Sheriff's Office
 Haskell County Sheriff's Office
 Hodgeman County Sheriff's Office
 Jackson County Sheriff's Office
 Jefferson County Sheriff's Office
 Jewell County Sheriff's Office
 Johnson County Sheriff's Office
 Kearny County Sheriff's Office
 Kingman County Sheriff's Office
 Kiowa County Sheriff's Office
 Labette County Sheriff's Office
 Lane County Sheriff's Office
 Leavenworth County Sheriff's Office
 Lincoln County Sheriff's Office
 Linn County Sheriff's Office
 Logan County Sheriff's Office
 Lyon County Sheriff's Office
 Marion County Sheriff's Office
 Marshall County Sheriff's Office
 McPherson County Sheriff's Office
 Meade County Sheriff's Office
 Miami County Sheriff's Office
 Mitchell County Sheriff's Office
 Montgomery County Sheriff's Office
 Morris County Sheriff's Office
 Morton County Sheriff's Office
 Nemaha County Sheriff's Office
 Neosho County Sheriff's Office
 Ness County Sheriff's Office
 Norton County Sheriff's Office
 Osage County Sheriff's Office

 Osborne County Sheriff's Office
 Ottawa County Sheriff's Office
 Pawnee County Sheriff's Office
 Phillips County Sheriff's Office
 Pottawatomie County Sheriff's Office
 Pratt County Sheriff's Office
 Rawlins County Sheriff's Office
 Reno County Sheriff's Office
 Republic County Sheriff's Office
 Rice County Sheriff's Office
 Riley County Police Department
 Rooks County Sheriff's Office
 Rush County Sheriff's Office
 Russell County Sheriff's Office
 Saline County Sheriff's Office
 Scott County Sheriff's Office
 Sedgwick County Sheriff's Office
 Seward County Sheriff's Office
 Shawnee County Sheriff's Office
 Sheridan County Sheriff's Office
 Sherman County Sheriff's Office
 Smith County Sheriff's Office
 Stafford County Sheriff's Office
 Stanton County Sheriff's Office
 Stevens County Sheriff's Office
 Sumner County Sheriff's Office
 Thomas County Sheriff's Office
 Trego County Sheriff's Office
 Wabaunsee County Sheriff's Office
 Wallace County Sheriff's Office
 Washington County Sheriff's Office
 Wichita County Sheriff's Office
 Wilson County Sheriff's Office
 Woodson County Sheriff's Office
 Wyandotte County Sheriff's Office

Municipal agencies 

 Abilene Police Department
 Altamont Police Department
 Andale Police Department
 Andover Police Department
 Anthony Police Department
 Argonia Police Department
 Arkansas City Police Department
 Arma Police Department
 Atchison Police Department
 Atwood Police Department
 Augusta Department of Public Safety
 Baldwin City Police Department
 Bartlett Police Department
 Basehor Police Department
 Baxter Springs Police Department
 Bel Aire Police Department
 Belleville Police Department
 Beloit Police Department
 Bentley Police Department
 Blue Rapids Police Department
 Bonner Springs Police Department
 Burlingame Police Department
 Burlington Police Department
 Burrton Police Department
 Caney Police Department
 Carbondale Police Department
 Cedar Vale Police Department
 Chanute Police Department
 Chapman Police Department
 Chase Police Department
 Cheney Police Department
 Cherokee City Police Department
 Cherryvale Police Department
 Chetopa Police Department
 Cimarron Police Department
 Circleville Police Department
 Clay Center Police Department
 Clearwater Police Department
 Coffeyville Police Department
 Colby Police Department
 Coldwater Police Department
 Columbus Police Department
 Colwich Police Department
 Concordia Police Department
 Conway Springs Police Department
 Council Grove Police Department
 Derby Police Department
 Dodge City Police Department
 Eastborough Police Department
 Edwardsville Police Department
 El Dorado Police Department
 Elkhart Police Department
 Ellinwood Police Department
 Ellis Police Department
 Ellsworth Police Department
 Elwood Police Department
 Emporia Police Department
 Enterprise Police Department
 Erie Police Department
 Eskridge Police Department
 Eudora Police Department
 Fairway Police Department
 Florence Police Department
 Fort Scott Police Department
 Frankfort Police Department
 Fredonia Police Department
 Frontenac Police Department
 Galena Police Department
 Garden City Police Department
 Gardner Police Department
 Garnett Police Department
 Girard Police Department
 Goddard Police Department
 Goodland Police Department
 Grandview Plaza Police Department

 Great Bend Police Department
 Greeley Police Department
 Greensburg Police Department
 Halstead Police Department
 Harper Police Department 
 Haven Police Department
 Hays Police Department
 Haysville Police Department
 Herington Police Department
 Hesston Police Department
 Hiawatha Police Department
 Highland Police Department
 Hill City Police Department
 Hillsboro Police Department
 Hoisington Police Department
 Holton Police Department
 Horton Police Department
 Howard Police Department
 Hoxie Police Department
 Hoyt Police Department
 Hugoton Police Department
 Humboldt Police Department
 Hutchinson Police Department
 Independence Police Department
 Inman Police Department
 Iola Police Department
 Junction City Police Department
 Kansas City Police Department
 Kechi Police Department
 Kingman Police Department
 Kinsley Police Department
 Kiowa Police Department
 La Crosse Police Department
 La Cygne Police Department
 La Harpe Police Department
 Lansing Police Department
 Larned Police Department
 Lawrence Police Department
 Le Roy Police Department
 Leavenworth Police Department
 Leawood Police Department
 Lenexa Police Department
 Lewis Police Department
 Liberal Police Department
 Lindsborg Police Department
 Louisburg Police Department
 Lyndon Police Department
 Lyons Police Department
 Maize Police Department
 Marion Police Department
 Marysville Police Department
 Mayetta Police Department
 McPherson Police Department
 Meade Police Department
 Metropolitan Topeka Airport Authority Police Department
 Melvern Police Department
 Medicine Lodge Police Department
 Meriden Police Department
 Merriam Police Department
 Minneapolis Police Department
 Mission Police Department
 Moran Police Department
 Mound City Police Department
 Moundridge Police Department
 Mt. Hope Police Department
 Mulberry Police Department
 Mulvane Police Department
 Neodesha Police Department
 Newton Police Department
 Nickerson Police Department
 North Newton Police Department
 Norton Police Department
 Nortonville Police Department
 Oakley Police Department

 Oberlin Police Department
 Olathe Police Department
 Onaga Police Department
 Osage City Police Department
 Osawatomie Police Department
 Osborne Police Department
 Oskaloosa Police Department
 Oswego Police Department
 Ottawa Police Department
 Overbrook Police Department
 Overland Park Police Department
 Oxford Police Department
 Paola Police Department
 Park City Police Department
 Parsons Police Department
 Peabody Police Department
 Perry Police Department
 Pittsburg Police Department
 Plainville Police Department
 Pleasanton Police Department
 Prairie Village Police Department
 Pratt Police Department
 Protection Police Department
 Quinter Police Department
 Richmond Police Department
 Riley County Police Department
 Roeland Park Police Department
 Rolla Police Department
 Rose Hill Police Department
 Rossville Police Department
 Russell Police Department
 Sabetha Police Department
 Saint Francis Police Department
 Saint John Police Department
 Saint Marys Police Department
 Salina Police Department
 Scott City Police Department
 Scranton Police Department
 Sedan Police Department
 Sedgwick Police Department
 Seneca Police Department
 Shawnee Police Department
 Silver Lake Police Department
 Smith Center Police Department
 South Hutchinson Police Department
 Spring Hill Police Department
 Stafford Police Department
 Sterling Police Department
 Stockton Police Department
 Tonganoxie Police Department
 Topeka Police Department
 Towanda Police Department
 Troy Police Department
 Udall Police Department
 Ulysses Police Department
 Valley Center Police Department
 Valley Falls Police Department
 Victoria Police Department
 WaKeeney Police Department
 Wakefield Police Department
 Walton Police Department
 Wamego Police Department
 Wathena Police Department
 Waverly Police Department
 Weir Police Department
 Wellington Police Department
 Wellsville Police Department
 Westwood Police Department
 Wichita Police Department
 Wilson Police Department
 Winchester Police Department
 Winfield Police Department
 Yates Center Police Department

Tribal agencies 
 Kickapoo Tribal Police Department of Kansas
 Iowa Tribe in Kansas Tribal Police Department 
 Prairie Band Potawatomi Tribal Police Department 
 Sac & Fox Tribal Police Department

School, College and University agencies 
 Auburn-Washburn Schools Police Department
 Butler Community Colleges Department of Public Safety
 Emporia State University Police and Safety
 Fort Hays State University Police Department
 Johnson County Community College Police Department
 Kansas City Kansas Community College Police Department (KCKCC)
 Kansas City Kansas Public Schools Police Department (USD500)
 Kansas State University Police Department
 Shawnee Mission School District Police Department
 University of Kansas Hospital Police, Kansas City Kansas
 University of Kansas Police Department
 Goddard USD 265 Police Department
 Maize USD 266 Police Department
 Topeka USD 501 Police Department
 Washburn University Police Department
 Wichita State University Police Department

Defunct Agencies 
 Kansas State Teachers College Police Department

References

Kansas
Law enforcement agencies of Kansas
Law enforcement agencies